Bristol Hotel is a hotel in Odesa, Ukraine. Built between 1898 and 1899, it is located in the city centre in Pushkinska Street, opposite the Odesa Philharmonic Theater.

Description
This stylish four-star 19th century hotel belongs to the same company as the nearby four-star Londonskaya Hotel which is roughly half the size.

History
The hotel was designed in a mixed Renaissance Revival and Baroque Revival Victorian style, with Neoclassical statues and white marble columns facing the street. It has 113 rooms and is one of the city's notable landmarks.

The hotel was built between 1898 and 1899 to designs by Alexander Bernadazzi and Adolf Minkus and named the Bristol Hotel. Bernadazzi was an influential architect in Odesa at the time and the style of buildings in Odesa is assigned to him in particular. The name of the Bristol Hotel is thought to emblematic of luxury as another hotel built at that time was named the Hotel London.

After the Soviet revolution, the hotel closed in 1917. It sat vacant for some time, eventually serving as offices from 1922 to 1925. It reopened in 1928, but in the Soviet Union it seemed inappropriate for the hotel to be named after the city of Bristol in England, so it was renamed the Hotel Krasnaya (meaning "Red" in Russian) for the Red banner of the Revolution. The hotel closed in 2002 and underwent a lengthy restoration, reopening under its original name on December 15, 2010.

Gallery

Notes

External links
Bristol Hotel official website

Hotels in Odesa
Pushkinska Street, Odesa
Hotel buildings completed in 1899
Hotels established in 1899
1890s establishments in Ukraine
1899 establishments in the Russian Empire
Victorian architecture in Ukraine